The Church of St Mary of the Angels, Worthing, is in Worthing, West Sussex, England. It is a Grade II listed building and the earliest of the four Roman Catholic churches in Worthing. It is an active Roman Catholic parish church in the diocese of Arundel & Brighton and the Worthing deanery.

History
The Church of St Mary of the Angels was opened by Thomas Grant, Roman Catholic bishop of Southwark, the first local Roman Catholic bishop since the Reformation.

The church was built on land bought by Thomas Gaisford, owner of Offington Hall in Broadwater. Previously Gaisford had allowed the new chapel he had built at Offington Hall to be used by the public from 1859. Gaisford had previously married the Catholic Lady Emily St Lawrence, daughter of Thomas St Lawrence, 3rd Earl of Howth and Lady Emily de Burgh. The church was the first place of Catholic worship in Worthing.

The church was built with the Our Lady of Sion convent adjacent to the church. The convent is run by the Sisters of Sion, who also founded the nearby independent school Our Lady of Sion School. The church lies at the corner of Richmond Road and Crescent Road, close to the triumphal arch of Park Crescent.

Architecture
Originally designed by Henry Clutton in the style of French Gothic revival with an exterior built of red brick with Portland stone, the church was extended by Frederick Walters in 1897-1907 to include a baptistery and an extension to the porch and sacristy. The church contains a  bell tower with a miniature spire.

References

External links
 Church website
 Worthing Borough Council Listed Building Register

Grade II listed churches in West Sussex
Saint Mary of the Angels
Roman Catholic churches completed in 1864
Gothic Revival church buildings in England
Gothic Revival architecture in West Sussex
Roman Catholic churches in West Sussex
19th-century Roman Catholic church buildings in the United Kingdom
Frederick Walters buildings
Henry Clutton buildings